is a passenger railway station in located in the city of Higashiōsaka, Osaka Prefecture, Japan, operated by West Japan Railway Company (JR West).

Lines

Station layout
The station has two elevated side platforms, each capable of accommodating eight-car trains, with the station building underneath. The station has a Midori no Madoguchi staffed ticket office.

Platforms

Adjacent stations

History
The station was opened on 21 April 1912.

Station numbering was introduced in March 2018 with Kōnoikeshinden being assigned station number JR-H37.

Future plans 
Osaka Monorail will be extended to the station in 2029.

Passenger statistics
In fiscal 2019, the station was used by an average of 13,584 passengers daily (boarding passengers only).

Surrounding area
Kōnoike Shinden kaisho
Taisei Gakuin University (Koike Sports Campus)
Taisei Gakuin University Junior and Senior High School
Osaka Prefectural Joto Technical High School

References

External links

Official home page 

Railway stations in Osaka Prefecture
Railway stations in Japan opened in 1912
 Higashiōsaka